Dutch sportspeople who are famous or notable include:

Athletics
Fanny Blankers-Koen (1918–2004)
Ellen van Langen (born 1966)
Churandy Martina (born 1984)
Tinus Osendarp (1916–2002)
Dafne Schippers (born 1992)
Mien Schopman-Klaver (1911-2018)
Rutger Smith (born 1981)
Wilma van den Berg (born 1947), sprinter

Baseball
Loek van Mil (1984-2019)
Roel de Mon (1919-1973)
Rick Van den Hurk (born 1985)

Basketball
Francisco Elson (born 1976)
Dan Gadzuric (born 1978)
Rik Smits (born 1966)

BMX
Merle van Benthem (born 1992)
Twan van Gendt (born 1992)
Jelle van Gorkom (born 1991)
Niek Kimmann (born 1996)
Laura Smulders (born 1993)

Cycling

Dylan van Baarle (born 1992)
Anna van der Breggen (born 1990)
Ellen van Dijk (born 1987)
Tom Dumoulin (born 1990)
Robert Gesink (born 1986)
Jan Janssen (born 1940)
Steven Kruijswijk (born 1987)
Elis Ligtlee (born 1994)
Bauke Mollema (born 1986)
Leontien van Moorsel (born 1970)
Teun Mulder (born 1981)
Mathieu van der Poel (born 1995)
Wout Poels (born 1987)
Maarten Tjallingii (born 1977)
Annemiek van Vleuten (born 1982)
Marianne Vos (born 1987)
Joop Zoetemelk (born 1946)

Darts
Raymond van Barneveld (born 1967)
Michael van Gerwen (born 1989)
Jelle Klaasen (born 1984)

Fighting

Boxing
Peter Müllenberg (born 1987)
Bep van Klaveren (1907–1992)
Regilio Tuur (born 1967)
Arnold Vanderlyde (born 1963)

Judo
Linda Bolder (born 1988), Israeli-Dutch Olympic judoka
Edith Bosch (born 1980)
Dex Elmont (born 1984)
Anicka van Emden (born 1986)
Noël van 't End (born 1991)
Anton Geesink (1934–2010)
Henk Grol (born 1985)
Jeroen Mooren (born 1985)
Kim Polling (born 1991)
Wim Ruska (1940-2015)
Marhinde Verkerk (born 1985)

Kickboxing
Ernesto Hoost (born 1965)
Lucia Rijker (born 1967)

MMA
Alistair Overeem (born 1980)
Bas Rutten (born 1965)

Wrestling
Jessica Blaszka (born 1992)
Emil Sitoci (born 1985)
Aleister Black (born 1985)

Fencing
Lion van Minden (1880–1944), Olympic fencer who was killed in the Auschwitz concentration camp
Simon Okker (1881–1944), Olympic fencer killed in the Auschwitz concentration camp

Football
Ryan Babel (born 1986)
Marco van Basten (born 1964)
Dennis Bergkamp (born 1969)
Frank de Boer (born 1970)
Ronald de Boer (born 1970)
Giovanni van Bronckhorst (born 1975)
Daniël de Ridder (born 1984)
Roel Buikema (born 1976)
Johan Cruijff (1947-2016)
Edgar Davids (born 1973)
Virgil van Dijk (born 1991)
Louis van Gaal (born 1951)
Ruud Gullit (born 1962)
 Eddy Hamel (1902–1943), Jewish-American soccer player for Dutch club AFC Ajax who was killed by the Nazis in Auschwitz concentration camp
Willem van Hanegem (born 1944)
Jimmy Floyd Hasselbaink (born 1972)
John Heitinga (born 1983)
Guus Hiddink (born 1946)
Patrick Kluivert (born 1976)
Ronald Koeman (born 1963)
Dirk Kuyt (born 1980)
Bob Mulder (born 1974)
Dustley Mulder (born 1985)
Erwin Mulder (born 1989)
Jan Mulder (born 1945)
Youri Mulder (born 1969)
Bennie Muller (born 1938), footballer 
Ruud van Nistelrooy (born 1976)
Robin van Persie (born 1983)
Frank Rijkaard (born 1962)
Arjen Robben (born 1984)
Johnny Roeg (1910–2003), striker for Ajax
Edwin van der Sar (born 1970)
Clarence Seedorf (born 1976)
Gerald Sibon (born 1974)
Wesley Sneijder (born 1984)
Sjaak Swart (born 1938)
Gregory van der Wiel (born 1988)

Gymnastics
Estella Agsteribbe (1909–1943)
Bart Deurloo (born 1991)
Yuri van Gelder (born 1983)
Céline van Gerner (born 1994)
Elka de Levie (1905–1979)
Helena Nordheim (1903–1943)
Vera van Pol (born 1993)
Annie Polak (1906–1943)
Frank Rijken (born 1996)
Judijke Simons (1904–1943)
Eythora Thorsdottir (born 1998)
Jeffrey Wammes (born 1987)
Lieke Wevers (born 1991)
Sanne Wevers (born 1991)
Epke Zonderland (born 1986)

Hockey

Field hockey
Naomi van As (born 1983)
Carina Benninga (born 1962)
Det de Beus (1958-2013)
Willemijn Bos (born 1988)
Floris Jan Bovelander (born 1966)
Jacques Brinkman (born 1966)
Marc Delissen (born 1965)
Cees Jan Diepeveen (born 1956)
Carlien Dirkse van den Heuvel (born 1987)
Ellen Hoog (born 1986)
Ties Kruize (born 1952)
Fatima Moreira de Melo (born 1978)
Eefke Mulder (born 1977)
Lau Mulder (1927-2006)
Teun de Nooijer (born 1976)
Maartje Paumen (born 1985)
Taeke Taekema (born 1980)
Carole Thate (born 1971)

Ice hockey
Hans Smalhout (1920–1942)
Jim Van der Meer (born 1980)

Ice skating

Figure skating
Boyito Mulder (born 1991)
Sjoukje Dijkstra (born 1942)

Speed skating
Lotte van Beek (born 1991)
Margot Boer (born 1985)
Jorrit Bergsma (born 1985)
Jan Blokhuijsen (born 1989)
Yvonne van Gennip (born 1964)
Stefan Groothuis (born 1981)
Bob de Jong (born 1976)
Carien Kleibeuker (born 1978)
Sven Kramer (born 1986)
Marrit Leenstra (born 1989)
Jorien ter Mors (born 1989)
Michel Mulder (born 1986)
Ronald Mulder (born 1986)
Rintje Ritsma (born 1970)
Gianni Romme (born 1973)
Ard Schenk (born 1944)
Jan Smeekens (born 1985)
Jochem Uytdehaage (born 1976)
Bart Veldkamp (born 1967)
Kees Verkerk (born 1942)
Koen Verweij (born 1990)
Ireen Wüst (born 1986)

Short-track speed skating
Sjinkie Knegt (born 1989)

Racing
Jeroen Bleekemolen (born 1981)
Tim Coronel (born 1972)
Tom Coronel (born 1972)
Wil Hartog (born 1948)
Arie Luyendyk (born 1953)
Renger van der Zande (born 1986)

Formula 1
Christijan Albers (born 1979)
Robert Doornbos (born 1981)
Bas Leinders (born 1975)
Jos Verstappen (born 1972)
Max Verstappen (born 1997)

Rowing
Chantal Achterberg (born 1985)
Claudia Belderbos (born 1985)
Carline Bouw (born 1984)
Roel Braas (born 1987)
Annemiek de Haan (born 1981)
Sytske de Groot (born 1986)
Nienke Kingma (born 1982)
Anne Schellekens (born 1986)
Roline Repelaer van Driel (born 1984)
Jacobine Veenhoven (born 1984)

Swimming
Inge de Bruijn (born 1974)
Pieter van den Hoogenband (born 1978)
Ada Kok (born 1947)
Ranomi Kromowidjojo (born 1990)
Rie Mastenbroek (1919–2003)
Petra van Staveren (born 1966)
Marleen Veldhuis (born 1979)
Marcel Wouda (born 1972)

Tennis

Kiki Bertens (born 1991)
 Eva Duldig (born 1938)
Jacco Eltingh (born 1970)
Paul Haarhuis (born 1966)
Robin Haase (born 1987)
Michaëlla Krajicek  (born 1989)
Richard Krajicek (born 1971)
Stephen Noteboom (born 1969)
Tom Okker (born 1944)
Betty Stöve (born 1945)
Martin Verkerk (born 1978)

Triathlon
Maya Kingma (born 1995)
Rachel Klamer (born 1990)

Volleyball

Indoor volleyball
Yvon Beliën (born 1993)
Anne Buijs (born 1991)
Laura Dijkema (born 1990)
Maret Grothues (born 1988)
Robin de Kruijf (born 1991)
Judith Pietersen (born 1989)
Celeste Plak (born 1995)
Myrthe Schoot (born 1988)
Lonneke Slöetjes (born 1990)
Debby Stam (born 1984)
Quinta Steenbergen (born 1985)
Femke Stoltenborg (born 1991)

Beach volleyball
Alexander Brouwer (born 1989)
Sophie van Gestel (born 1991)
Marleen van Iersel (born 1988)
Robert Meeuwsen (born 1988)
Madelein Meppelink (born 1989)
Reinder Nummerdor (born 1976)
Christiaan Varenhorst (born 1990)
Jantine van der Vlist (born 1985)

Water polo
Stan van Belkum (born 1961)
Mart Bras (born 1950)
Ton Buunk (born 1952)
Nico Landeweerd (born 1954)
Hans Wouda (born 1941)

Dutch